Armstrong-Walker House is a historic home located near Middletown, New Castle County, Delaware.  It was built about 1870, and consists of a -story, five bay brick main block with a service ell and later frame kitchen addition.  The house features an open front porch with square, paneled posts.  Also on the property is a contributing braced frame stable.

It was listed on the National Register of Historic Places in 1985.

References

Houses on the National Register of Historic Places in Delaware
Houses completed in 1870
Houses in New Castle County, Delaware
National Register of Historic Places in New Castle County, Delaware